The province of Zambales has 247 barangays comprising its 13 town and 1 city.

Barangays

References

.
Zambales
Zambales